Almenrausch and Edelweiss may refer to:
 Almenrausch and Edelweiss (1957 film), an Austrian-West German comedy film
 Almenrausch and Edelweiss (1928 film), a German silent drama film